The International Transfer of Offenders Act is Canadian federal legislation. Passed in 2004, it allows Canadians who had been convicted of a crime in another nation to apply to serve their sentence, or a portion thereof, in a Canadian prison.
The Act gives the Minister of Public Safety the authority to approve or decline prisoners' applications for transfer.

The Act was passed shortly before Conservative Stephen Harper was elected Prime Minister of Canada in 2005. Legal journalists and legal scholars criticized the Harper government for arbitrarily declining to approve transfers without adequate reasons. According to The Globe and Mail on January 19, 2012, Justice Robert Barnes ruled that Vic Toews had failed to provide adequate reasons when he declined to approve the transfer of Richard Goulet. Barnes called decisions like this "pro forma" decisions, which were usually approved because it was in Canada's interest to know when felons were scheduled for release, and because it was in Canada's interest to enrol prisoners in the Canadian parole system, so their transition from prison could be monitored. Barnes's ruling noted twelve other cases where Toews and his predecessors had declined to approve prisoner transfers without supplying an adequate explanation.

In 2009 the Canadian Civil Liberties Association criticized amendments the Conservatives were proposing to the law—amendments that relaxed the obligations the Minister of Public Safety had to explain his or her decisions.

References

Canadian federal legislation
2004 in Canadian law